Khuduklestes is a genus of extinct mammal of uncertain affinities from the Late Cretaceous of China. It is rather similar to the also carnivorous and taxonomically uncertain Oxlestes, being slightly smaller.

Description
Khuduklestes is currently represented by a single specimen, a vertebral axis, known from Cenomanian deposits in the Gansu Province of China. It is rather similar to Oxlestes and is among the largest vertebral mammalian remains from the Mesozoic, indicating a cat-sized animal.

Classification
Khuduklestes was initially placed in Deltatheroida on the basis of its similarity to Oxlestes. However, much as Oxlestes, its identity as a deltatheroidean has also been questioned, and it has periodically also been considered a member of the eutherian clade of mammals.

References

Prehistoric metatherians
Prehistoric eutherians
Late Cretaceous mammals of Asia
Fossil taxa described in 1994
Prehistoric mammal genera